Eriolobus is a genus of plants in the family Rosaceae, native to Europe and the Middle East. Two species are known: Eriolobus florentinus and Eriolobus trilobatus.

References

Maleae
Rosaceae genera